Gebe, or Minyaifuin, is an Austronesian language of eastern Indonesia, spoken on the islands between Halmahera and Waigeo.

References

Further reading 

South Halmahera–West New Guinea languages
Languages of western New Guinea
Halmahera